Roger Thompson (born 19 December 1991) is a Canadian professional soccer player who plays as a centre-back for York United.

Club career

Early career
After moving to Canada, Thompson started playing football at Brampton East SC. He later played with Vaughan SC.

In 2009, he played 14 matches for the Graceland University, scoring three goals.

In 2010 he attended the University of Cincinnati and made 19 appearances for the Cincinnati Bearcats. In 2011 Thompson was able to play just three matches due to injury.

Vasa IFK
In early 2012 Thompson trained two weeks with Veikkausliiga club VPS Vaasa, but he wasn't signed. In April 2012 he signed a year-long contract with another Vaasa based club Vasa IFK. He played 21 matches for the team at the Finnish third tier Kakkonen.

IFK Mariehamn
In January 2013, Thompson was signed for two years by IFK Mariehamn.

KSV Baunatal
In November 2014, Thompson signed with German Regionalliga side KSV Baunatal.

Trelleborgs FF
In August 2015, Thompson signed with Swedish Division 1 club Trelleborgs FF and helped them earn promotion to the Superettan.

Ljungskile SK
In March 2017, Thompson signed with Swedish Division 1 club Ljungskile SK.

York United FC
Thompson signed with Canadian Premier League club York9 FC on 7 January 2019, which later became known as York United FC beginning in the 2021 season.

International career
Thompson is eligible to represent Canada by naturalization and Jamaica by birth.

Thompson earned his first call-up to the Canada U-20 team for the 2010 COTIF Tournament. He participated in two more Canada U-20 camps before being named to Canada's squad for the 2011 CONCACAF U-20 Championship, where he made three appearances.

Career statistics

Personal life
Thompson was born in Clarendon Parish, Jamaica to Jamaican parents and moved to Brampton, Ontario at the age of ten.

References

External links
 
 

1991 births
Living people
Association football defenders
Canadian soccer players
Jamaican footballers
People from Clarendon Parish, Jamaica
Black Canadian soccer players
Jamaican emigrants to Canada
Naturalized citizens of Canada
Canadian expatriate soccer players
Jamaican expatriate footballers
Expatriate footballers in Finland
Canadian expatriate sportspeople in Finland
Jamaican expatriate sportspeople in Finland
Expatriate footballers in Germany
Canadian expatriate sportspeople in Germany
Jamaican expatriate sportspeople in Germany
Expatriate footballers in Sweden
Canadian expatriate sportspeople in Sweden
Jamaican expatriate sportspeople in Sweden
Graceland Yellowjackets men's soccer players
Cincinnati Bearcats men's soccer players
Vasa IFK players
IFK Mariehamn players
Trelleborgs FF players
Ljungskile SK players
York United FC players
Kakkonen players
Veikkausliiga players
Regionalliga players
Ettan Fotboll players
Superettan players
Canadian Premier League players
Canada men's youth international soccer players
Soccer players from Brampton
Vaughan Azzurri players